Fourneaux is a commune in the Savoie department in the Auvergne-Rhône-Alpes region in south-eastern France.

Notable people 

 Claudio Angelo Giuseppe Calabrese, (1867-1932), bishop of Aosta

Gallery

See also
Communes of the Savoie department

References

Communes of Savoie